WCR can refer to:

 WCR FM, a community radio station in Wolverhampton, England
 Waterloo Central Railway, a heritage railway in Ontario, Canada
 West Central Railway zone, India
 West Clare Railway, a former railway in Ireland, now a heritage railway
 West Coast Railway (Victoria), a railway operator in Australia
 West Coast Railways, a charter train operator in Lancashire, England
 West Cross Route, in London
 World Championship Rugby, a 2004 rugby union video game
 World Classic Rockers, a rock band featuring former members of Steppenwolf
 World Climate Report
 World Congress of Rusyns

See also
 West Coast Railway (disambiguation)